"Bloom" is a song by Australian band The Paper Kites, released independently as the band's first single in 2010. "Bloom" was written by Samuel Bentley and Christina Lacy, and produced by Tim Johnston and the Paper Kites themselves. In the United States, the song was certified platinum for digital sales by the RIAA in 2021, over ten years after its release.

Background 
After the release of a homemade EP that the Paper Kites used to sell at their shows in Melbourne, the band recorded and released independently their first single, "Bloom", which increased the popularity of the band throughout Australia. "Bloom" is included as the opening track in their second independent 2010 EP Bloom, then it was included as a bonus track in the digital release of the former 2011 EP Woodland dropped on March 5, 2013, and finally was released as a single with "Renegade" in 2016.

Music video 
Although the band didn't release the single physically, they published a video for "Bloom". The music video was directed by Pete Seamons and vocalist Sam Bentley. The clip starts with a woman and man waking up, finding both of them a tin can phone, deciding to follow the cord through a forest. It also shows the band members playing their respective instruments around a tree. Finally, both meet and follow the cord up to the tree where the band members were playing, finding only a banjo leaning on the tree.

Personnel 
Adapted from the "Bloom" liner notes.

The Paper Kites

 Sam Bentley: lead vocals, guitar
 Christina Lacy: background vocals, guitar
 David Powys: background vocals, guitar, banjo
 Josh Bentley: percussion
 Sam Rasmussen: bass

Production

Tim Johnston: production
The Paper Kites: production

Certifications

References

External links
 

2010 singles
2010 songs
The Paper Kites songs